Monmouth Beach is a pebble and rock beach stretching approximately  westwards from the harbour at Lyme Regis, West Dorset to Pinhay Bay, East Devon. It is part of the Jurassic Coast, situated below Ware Cliffs, and includes Poker's Pool, Virtle Rock and Chippel Bay. Virtle Rock is the farthest islet from the coast in Poker's Pool.

The name derives from the landing here of Duke of Monmouth in 1685 during his attempt to take the crown from King James II. Following the defeat of the Duke of Monmouth, twelve locals were hanged on the beach on the order of the notorious "Hanging Judge" Jeffreys.

Fossils 
Monmouth Beach is now owned by the National Trust, and is very popular with fossil hunters, as ammonites, belemnites, plant fossils and even a few remains of Ichthyosaur vertebrae fossils have been found here. The cliffs are estimated to be 199-189 million years old.

External links 
 Monmouth Beach Website
 Lyme Regis Website
 The National Trust Jurassic Coast Webpage

Beaches of Dorset
National Trust properties in Dorset
Jurassic Coast
Lyme Regis